George Harvey (7 May 1885 – 8 September 1962) was an Australian cricketer. He played seven first-class matches for New South Wales between 1909/10 and 1911/12.

See also
 List of New South Wales representative cricketers

References

External links
 

1885 births
1962 deaths
Australian cricketers
New South Wales cricketers
People from Mudgee
Cricketers from New South Wales